Countess Eloise of Oranje-Nassau, Jonkvrouwe van Amsberg (Eloise Beatrix Sophie Laurence; born 8 June 2002), in the media often styled as simply Eloise van Oranje, is the first child and daughter of Prince Constantijn and Princess Laurentien of the Netherlands. She is the first grandchild of Queen Beatrix and Prince Claus of the Netherlands, as the only grandchild who was born in Prince Claus’ lifetime. She is a member of the Dutch royal family and currently fifth in the line of succession to the Dutch throne.

Life 
Countess Eloise was born in HMC Bronovo Hospital in The Hague. She lives with her parents, her brother and her sister in The Hague.

The christening of Countess Eloise took place in the chapel of Het Loo Palace in Apeldoorn on 15 December 2002. Her godparents are her paternal uncle Prince Friso, her father's first cousin Princess Carolina, Marchioness of Sala, the Crown Prince of Norway and Sophie van de Wow.

Countess Eloise graduated from Maerlant Lyceum in 2020, and is a student at Hotelschool in the Hague. On 27 August 2020 an article appeared in Dutch gossip magazine Weekend about her student life, with a photograph showing Eloise smoking a cigarette.

Style, titles and names

By Royal Decree of 11 May 2001, nr. 227, it was determined that all children and male-line descendants of Prince Constantijn of the Netherlands would bear the title of Count (Countess) of Orange-Nassau and the honorific Jonkheer (Jonkvrouwe) van Amsberg with the style of "His/Her Highborn Lord/Lady" and have the surname Van Oranje-Nassau van Amsberg.

Upon the abdication of Queen Beatrix, which took place on 30 April 2013, the children of Prince Constantijn and Princess Laurentien ceased to be members of the royal house, although they continue to be members of the royal family.

References

2002 births
Living people
House of Orange-Nassau
Jonkvrouws of Amsberg
Countesses of Orange-Nassau